A standard drink is a measure of alcohol consumption representing a hypothetical beverage which contains a fixed amount of pure alcohol. A standard drink varies in volume depending on the alcohol concentration of the beverage (for example, a standard drink of spirits takes up much less space than a standard drink of beer), but it always contains the same amount of alcohol and therefore produces the same amount of drunkenness.

The standard drink is used in relation to recommendations about alcohol consumption and its relative risks to health. Many government health guidelines specify low to high risk amounts in units of grams of pure alcohol per day, week, or single occasion. The concept of the standard drink is meant to help visualize and estimate the absolute alcohol content of various drink concentrations and serving sizes.

Labeling is usually required to give an indication of alcoholic content of a serving.

Definitions in various countries
The standard drink or standard unit aims at comparing the pure ethanol regardless of the type of beverage.
It helps to educate alcohol users. These are the amounts of alcohol defined by several countries for standardising measurement of drinking levels and providing public health information.

Different countries define standard drinks differently. For example, Australia, a standard drink contains 10 grams of alcohol, but in Japan, one "unit" contains approximately 20 grams. In addition, a standard drink is often different from normal serving size in the country in which it is served.

The term "standard drink" was used in the United Kingdom in the first guidelines (1984) that published "safe limits" for drinking, but this was replaced by reference to units of alcohol in the 1987 guidelines and that term has been used in all subsequent UK guidance. A unit of alcohol is defined there as 10 millilitres (8 grams) of pure alcohol. This definition is independent of the strength (% ABV) and amount (volume) of any individual alcoholic beverage. The number of units of alcohol in a bottle or can (and, optionally, the number of units in a typical serving) are indicated on the drink container. Typical servings deliver 1–3 units of alcohol.

In the United States, a standard drink is defined as 0.6 US fluid ounce of ethanol per serving, which is about 14 grams of alcohol. This corresponds to a  can of 5% beer, a  glass of 12% ABV (alcohol by volume) wine, or a  so-called "shot" of spirit, assuming that beer is 5% ABV, wine is 12% ABV, and spirits is 40% ABV (80 proof).

Most wine today is higher than 12% ABV (the average ABV in Napa Valley in 1971 was 12.5% ). 80 proof is still the standard for spirits, though higher alcohol content is common.

There is no international consensus on how much pure alcohol is contained in a standard unit.
Some choose to base the definition on mass of alcohol (in grams) while others base the unit on the volume (in mL or other volume units). 
This makes different quantities for a "standard" drink/unit in different countries depending on local customs and beverage packaging.

For comparison, both measurements are shown here. There is no single standard, but a standard drink of 10 g alcohol, which is used in the WHO AUDIT (Alcohol Use Disorders Identification Test)'s questionnaire form example, have been adopted by more countries than any other amount. The terminology for the unit also varies, as shown in the Notes column.

Within the European Union, the most frequent value is 10 g of pure ethanol, followed by 12 g, but units vary from 8 to 20 g.

Calculation of pure alcohol mass in a serving
Pure alcohol mass in a serving can be calculated if concentration, density and volume are known.

For example, a 350 ml glass of beer with an ABV of 5.5% contains 19.25 ml of pure alcohol, which has a density of 0.78945 g/mL (at 20 °C), and therefore a mass of 15.20 grams.

or

When drink size is in fluid ounces (which differ between the UK and the US), the following conversions can be used:

One should bear in mind that a pint in the UK is 20 imperial fluid ounces, whereas a pint in the US is 16 US fluid ounces. However, as 1 imperial fl. oz. ≈ 0.961 US fl. oz., this means 1 imperial pint ≈ 1.201 US pints (i.e. 0.961 × 20/16) instead of 1.25 US pints.

Standard drink sizes (Australia)
 375 ml can of light beer (2.7% alcohol) = 0.8 standard drinks
 375 ml can of mid-strength beer (3.5% alcohol) = 1 standard drink
 375 ml can of full strength beer (4.8% alcohol) = 1.4 standard drinks
 100 ml glass of wine (13.5% alcohol) = 1 standard drink
 150 ml glass of wine (13.5% alcohol) = 1.5 standard drinks
 30 ml shot of spirits (40% alcohol) = 0.95 standard drinks
 440 ml can of pre-mix spirits (approx. 5% alcohol) = 1.7 standard drinks
 440 ml can pre-mix spirits (approx. 7% alcohol) = 2.4 standard drinks

Relation to blood alcohol content

As a rough guide, it takes about one hour for the body to metabolize (break down) one UK unit of alcohol, 10 ml (8 grams). However, this can vary with body weight, sex, age, personal metabolic rate, recent food intake, the type and strength of the alcohol, and medications taken. Alcohol may be metabolized more slowly if liver function is impaired. As a rule of thumb of the time to metabolize, multiply one hour by the number of alcohol units in the local definition of a standard drink. For example, in the United States one standard drink contains 14 grams ≈ 1.75 units of alcohol, and so takes the body about an hour and three-quarters to process.

Blood alcohol content can more accurately be estimated by a method developed by Swedish professor  in the 1920s:

where:
 is the mass of alcohol consumed.
 is the ratio of body water to total weight. It varies between individuals but averages about 0.68 for men and 0.55 for women, since women tend to have a higher percentage of fat.
 is body weight.
 is the rate at which alcohol is metabolized. It is approximately 0.017% per hour.
 is the amount time during which alcohol was present in the blood (usually time since consumption began).

Regarding metabolism in the formula; females demonstrated a higher average rate of elimination (mean, 0.017; range, 0.014–0.021 g/210 L) than males (mean, 0.015; range, 0.013–0.017 g/210 L).

Examples:
 80 kg male drinking 2 drinks of 14 grams (0.014 kg) each, in two hours:

 70 kg woman drinking 1.5 drinks of 14 grams each, in two hours:

Labeling 
Labeling is usually required to give an indication of alcoholic content of a serving. Australia requires that "the label on a package of an alcoholic beverage must include a statement of the number of standard drinks in the package".

Research in the UK has shown that including pictures of units and a statement of the drinking guidelines could help people understand the recommended limits better.

See also

 Alcoholic spirits measure
 Unit of alcohol

References

External links
Online converter between different countries' standard drinks and units
IARD: Drinking Guidelines General Population by country

Units of volume
Alcohol measurement

da:Genstand (alkohol)